Alla Mikayelyan (born 19 December 1969) is an Armenian cross-country skier. She competed in the women's 30 kilometre freestyle at the 1998 Winter Olympics. She was also the flag bearer for Armenia at the Winter Olympics.

References

External links
 

1969 births
Living people
Armenian female cross-country skiers
Olympic cross-country skiers of Armenia
Cross-country skiers at the 1998 Winter Olympics
People from Ararat Province